Patagones Partido is the southernmost partido of Buenos Aires Province in Argentina.

It is bordered on the north by Villarino Partido.

Economy

The economy of Patagones Partido is dominated by farming.

Settlements (population)

Bahía San Blas (463)
Cardenal Cagliero (113) 
Carmen de Patagones  (18,189)   
José B. Casas (38) 
Juan A. Pradere (413) 
Stroeder (1,975) 
Villalonga (3,705)  
rural diaspora (3,042)

External links
Tourist Information (Spanish)
Carmen de Patagones

Partidos of Buenos Aires Province
States and territories established in 1779